Jim Eyre may refer to:
 Jim Eyre (caver), British caver
 Jim Eyre (architect), British architect and winner of the Bodley Medal

See also
James Eyre (disambiguation)